Jacob Willem "Johim" Ariesen (born 16 March 1988 in Rhenen) is a Dutch cyclist, who most recently rode for Dutch amateur team Mooi Jong–HSK Trias.

Major results

2009
 6th Scandinavian Open Road Race
 10th Ronde van Midden-Nederland
2010
 4th Arno Wallaard Memorial
 6th Dwars door Drenthe
 6th Kernen Omloop Echt-Susteren
 8th Münsterland Giro
 8th Ronde van Overijssel
2011
 4th Arno Wallaard Memorial
 6th Ronde van Midden-Nederland
 9th Kernen Omloop Echt-Susteren
2012
 7th Antwerpse Havenpijl
 8th Ronde van Midden-Nederland
2013
 1st  Mountains classification Olympia's Tour
 2nd Zuid Oost Drenthe Classic II
 7th Ronde van Midden-Nederland
 9th Ster van Zwolle
2014
 1st  Points classification Course de la Solidarité Olympique
 3rd Dorpenomloop Rucphen
 4th Destination Thy
 4th Skive–Løbet
 6th Ster van Zwolle
 6th Himmerland Rundt
 7th Ronde van Zeeland Seaports
2015
 1st  Overall Course de la Solidarité Olympique
1st  Points classification
1st Stages 1, 2, 4 & 5
 1st Ronde van Noord-Holland
 Volta ao Alentejo
1st Stages 3 & 5
 Tour of China I
1st  Points classification
1st Stage 3
 2nd Parel van de Veluwe
 3rd Himmerland Rundt
 3rd Kernen Omloop Echt-Susteren
 4th Overall Tour of China II
 5th Overall Ronde de l'Oise
1st  Points classification
1st Stage 1
 10th Overall World Ports Classic
 10th Arno Wallaard Memorial
 10th Dwars door Drenthe
2016
 1st Skive–Løbet
 1st GP Viborg
 1st Stage 3 Volta ao Alentejo
 Bałtyk–Karkonosze Tour
1st Stages 1 & 4
 4th Memorial Van Coningsloo
 5th Ster van Zwolle
 6th De Kustpijl
 6th Gooikse Pijl
 7th Arnhem–Veenendaal Classic
2017
 1st Stage 2 Volta ao Alentejo
 1st Stage 5 Tour de Normandie
 1st Stage 1 Bałtyk–Karkonosze Tour
 3rd Ronde van Overijssel
 7th ZODC Zuidenveld Tour
 7th Arno Wallaard Memorial
2018
 1st Stage 3 Tour de Normandie
 4th Skive–Løbet

References

External links

1988 births
Living people
Dutch male cyclists
People from Rhenen
Cyclists from Utrecht (province)
20th-century Dutch people
21st-century Dutch people